Battle of Tellidede was a clash around Aydın, Turkey during the Greco-Turkish War (1919–1922). The Greek army planning to throw back the Turkish irregular forces around Aydın, started an offensive at the Tellidede ridges.

Battle 

On 25 June, the Greek troops attacked the Turkish forces, who were located at the Ovaemir-Yeniköy-Kadıköy line. The right flank, defended by the Karadurmuş platoon, faced heavy machine gun fire. The left flank was defended by volunteers from Çakırbeyli, Beydere and Selami Bey's Koçarlı platoon. The center area was defended by the Çineli Tahir platoon. The defending forces numbered 200 men. They faced a Greek battalion of 800 men supported by heavy machine guns. Soon the Turks started to run out of ammunition. Furthermore, the terrain was impractical for defense against a much larger force. Facing these problems they decided to abandon the area and retreated southern to the Büyük Menderes River.

Result 
The Greeks had suffered over 30 killed and wounded during their offensive, while the Turks had sustained 6 killed and a few wounded during their retreat. After the battle, the Greek troops burnt down Ovaemir, Yeniköy and Kadıköy. Most of the residents of these settlements had fled earlier, only the elderly and disabled had stayed there. They were killed by the Greek soldiers. The headpieces, covered in the blood, of the killed Turks were stuck on the top of the rifle bayonets and presented to the Turkish residents of Aydın.

References

Sources
 Oğuz Gülcan, BATI ANADOLU’DA KUVAYI MİLLİYENİN OLUŞUMU (1919–1920), Ankara Üniversitesi Türk İnkılap Tarihi Enstitüsü, 2007, page 259-260 (Ankara University Open Archive System). 

Tellidede
History of Aydın Province
1919 in the Ottoman Empire
1919 in Greece
Tellidede
Tellidede
Tellidede
June 1919 events